Lucidella is a genus of land snails with an operculum, terrestrial gastropod mollusks in the subfamily Vianinae of the family Helicinidae.

Distribution
Distribution of the genus include Central America and Caribbean:
 Dominica - one undescribed species
 Jamaica - 12 species
 Cuba - 4 species: Lucidella granulum, Lucidella granum, Lucidella rugosa, Lucidella tantilla.
 Dominican Republic - 1 specie:Lucidella beatensis
 Haiti - At least three undetermined species.
 From Mexico to Costa Rica - Lucidella lirata
 Honduras
 South Florida
 French Guiana

Species
Thompson (2008) recognized four subgenera:
Lucidella Swainson, 1840, Poeniella H. B. Baker, 1923, Lidsleya Chitty, 1857, Poenia H. & A. Adams, 1856.

But Rosenberg & Muratov (2006) recognized also subgenus Perenna on Jamaica.

Species within the genus Lucidella include:

subgenus Lucidella Swainson, 1840
 Lucidella aureola (Férussac, 1822) - type species - photo
 Lucidella aureola montegoensis Brown, 1913
 Lucidella granulosa C. B. Adams, 1850
 Lucidella granulosa undulata Pfeiffer, 1862
 Lucidella inaequalis (Pfeiffer, 1859)
 Lucidella kobelti Wagner, 1910

subgenus Perenna
 Lucidella foxi Pilsbry, 1899
 Lucidella lineata (C. B. Adams, 1845)
 Lucidella nana Pfeiffer, 1857
 Lucidella persculpta Pilsbry & Brown, 1912
 Lucidella yallahsensis Pilsbry & Brown, 1912

subgenus Poenia H. Adams & A. Adams, 1856
 Lucidella adamsiana (Pfeiffer, 1849)
 Lucidella adamsiana sublaevis H. B. Baker, 1934
 Lucidella coronula (Pfeiffer, 1862)
 Lucidella depressa Gray, 1825
 Lucidella depressa valida (C. B. Adams, 1851)
 Lucidella pilsbryi Clapp, 1914 - from Honduras
 Lucidella pilsbryi indecora Pilsbry, 1930
 Lucidella midyetti Richards, 1938 - from Honduras

subgenus ?
 Lucidella granulum (Gundlach in Pfeiffer, 1864)
 Lucidella granum (Pfeiffer, 1856)
 Lucidella lirata (L. Pfeiffer, 1847) - from Mexico to Costa Rica
 Lucidella rugosa (Pfeiffer, 1839)
 Lucidella tantilla (Pilsbry, 1902) - ochre drop
 Lucidella sp. from Dominica

References

Further reading
 Boss K. J. & Jacobson M. K. (1974). "Monograph of the genus Lucidella in Cuba (Prosobranchia: Helicinidae)". Occasional Papers on Mollusks 4: 481–27.
 Boss K. J. & Jacobson M. K. (1974). "Catalogue of the taxa of Lucidella (Prosobranchia: Helicinidae)". Occasional Papers on Mollusks 4: 4929–38.
 Pilsbry H. A. (1928). "Review of the species of Lucidella belonging to the subgenus Poeniella (Helicinidae) of Haiti and Santo Domingo". Proceedings of the Academy of Natural Sciences of Philadelphia 80: 479–482, plate 27.

External links
 http://www.discoverlife.org/mp/20q?search=Lucidella

Helicinidae